Julia Babette Sarah Neuberger, Baroness Neuberger,  (née Schwab; born 27 February 1950) was the second woman to be ordained as a Rabbi in the UK, and is a British member of the House of Lords. She previously took the Liberal Democrat whip, but resigned from the party and became a crossbencher in 2011 upon becoming the full-time senior rabbi of the West London Synagogue, from which she retired in 2020. She became the chair of University College London Hospitals (UCLH) in 2019.

Early life
Neuberger was born Julia Babette Sarah Schwab in the Hampstead area of London on 27 February 1950, the daughter of art critic Liesel ("Alice") and civil servant Walter Schwab. Her mother was a German-Jewish refugee who had fled the Nazis, arriving in England at the age of 22 in 1937, while her father was born in England to German-Jewish immigrants who had settled there before World War I. The Schwab Trust, which supports and educates young refugees and asylum seekers, was later set up in her parents' name.  

She attended South Hampstead High School and Newnham College, Cambridge, where she first studied Assyriology. After she was refused entry to Turkey because she was British, and then to Iraq because she was Jewish, she had to change her subject and instead studied her second language of Hebrew full-time. Her lecturer at Cambridge, Nicholas de Lange, suggested she should become a rabbi. She obtained her rabbinic diploma at Leo Baeck College.

Career

Religious roles
Neuberger taught at her alma mater, Leo Baeck College, from 1977 to 1997. She later became Britain's second female rabbi, the first being Jackie Tabick, and the first to have her own synagogue. She was rabbi of the South London Liberal Synagogue from 1977 to 1989 and is president of West Central Liberal Synagogue. On 1 February 2011, the West London Synagogue (a Movement for Reform Judaism synagogue) announced that she had been appointed as senior rabbi of the synagogue. She retired from her West London Synagogue role in March 2020. She also regularly appears on the Pause for Thought section on BBC Radio 2.

Public sector activity
Neuberger was Chair of Camden and Islington Community Health Services NHS Trust from 1992 to 1997, and Chief Executive of the King's Fund from 1997 to 2004. She was also chancellor of the University of Ulster from 1994 to 2000. Who's Who lists a large number of voluntary and philanthropic roles she has undertaken. Her book, The Moral State We're In, a study of morality and public policy in modern Britain, was published in 2005. The title is an allusion to Will Hutton's 1997 book, The State We're In.

Political and parliamentary roles
Neuberger was the Social Democratic Party candidate for Tooting in the 1983 general election, coming third with 8,317 votes (18.1%). She was appointed a DBE in the New Year Honours of 2003. In June 2004, she was created a life peer as Baroness Neuberger, of Primrose Hill in the London Borough of Camden. She served as a Liberal Democrat Health spokesperson from 2004 to 2007. On 29 June 2007, Neuberger was appointed by the incoming Prime Minister Gordon Brown as the government's champion of volunteering. She resigned from the Liberal Democrats upon becoming senior rabbi of the West London Synagogue.

Controversy
In 1997, Neuberger criticised education in Northern Ireland as "sectarian" at the opening of Loughview Integrated Primary School. The Irish News claimed she had criticised Catholic schools as sectarian, leading to criticism from the Director of the Catholic Council for Maintained Schools. However, she said that the report from the Irish News had given a misleading impression and that she had been quoted out of context: "In fact, I think in what I actually said at the opening I didn't mention Catholic schools. I think I actually mentioned Protestant, Muslim and Jewish but then I was interviewed afterwards and I certainly said to the reporter that what I said applied just as much to Catholic schools as to Protestant or Jewish or Muslim or whatever."

Charity work 
In January 2013, Neuberger was appointed chair of an Independent Review of the Liverpool Care Pathway for the Dying Patient. The impartiality of the appointment was questioned by some of the bereaved families, due to her previous endorsement of the pathway, which was written by Dr John Ellershaw, medical director of the Marie Curie Palliative Care Institute in Liverpool, in a 2003 BMJ article, and her widely publicised support of the Marie Curie Institute. The results of the review were published in July 2013; accepting the review's recommendations, the government advised that NHS hospitals should phase out the use of the LCP.

Neuberger was elected vice-president of Attend, a charity that supports and expands the roles volunteers play in creating healthy communities, in 2006 and held the position until she retired in 2011.

Neuberger was appointed to the board of Irish health insurers Vhi Healthcare for a five-year period from 2005 by Mary Harney, the Tánaiste and Minister for Health and Children.

Neuberger is a Vice President of the Jewish Leadership Council.

Personal life
Neuberger married professor Anthony Neuberger on 17 September 1973. They have a son named Matthew and a daughter named Harriet.

In the wake of the Brexit vote in 2016, Neuberger stated that she would apply for a German passport, for which she is eligible through her parents. She said, "My decision has nothing at all to do with anti-Semitism, but with my origins, my admiration for how today's Germany has dealt with its past, and my sense of being European as well as British."

Titles and honours
Miss Julia Schwab (1950–marriage)
Mrs Julia Neuberger (marriage–1977)
Rabbi Julia Neuberger (1977–2003)
Rabbi Dame Julia Neuberger DBE (2003–2004)
Rabbi The Baroness Neuberger DBE (2004–)

Publications
The Story of Judaism (for children), 1986, 2nd edition 1988.
Days of Decision (Edited four in series), 1987.
Caring for Dying Patients of Different Faiths, 1987, 3rd edition 2004 (edited, with John A. White).
A Necessary End, 1991.
Whatever’s Happening to Women?, 1991.
Ethics and Healthcare: the role of Research Ethics Committees in the UK, 1992.
The Things That Matter (anthology of women's spiritual poetry, Edited by JN), 1993.
On Being Jewish, 1995.
Dying Well: a guide to enabling a better death, 1999, 2nd edition 2004.
Hidden Assets: values and decision-making in the NHS today, (edition with Bill New), 2002.
The Moral State We’re In, 2005.
Report on Volunteering,  2008.
Antisemitism: What it is; What it isn't and why it matters, 2019.

References

External links
Baroness Neuberger profile at the site of Parliament
2004 Interview by Joan Bakewell for Belief (BBC Radio 3)
Video interview with Baroness Neuberger on PMLiVE.com

1950 births
Living people
20th-century English rabbis
21st-century English rabbis
20th-century English women politicians
20th-century English politicians
21st-century English women politicians
21st-century English politicians
Alumni of Leo Baeck College
Alumni of Newnham College, Cambridge
British Ashkenazi Jews
British Liberal rabbis
Chancellors of Ulster University
Commanders Crosses of the Order of Merit of the Federal Republic of Germany
Crossbench life peers
Dames Commander of the Order of the British Empire
English Jews
English people of German-Jewish descent
Life peeresses created by Elizabeth II
Harkness Fellows
Liberal Democrats (UK) life peers
Julia
Ordained peers
People educated at South Hampstead High School
Rabbis from London
Social Democratic Party (UK) parliamentary candidates
West London Synagogue
Women rabbis